Nikola Yanakiev Karev ( and ; November 23, 1877 – April 27, 1905) was a Macedonian Bulgarian revolutionary in Ottoman-ruled Macedonia. He was born in Kırşova (now Kruševo) and died in the village of Rayçani (Rajčani), both today in North Macedonia. Karev was a local leader of what later became known as the Internal Macedonian Revolutionary Organization (IMRO). He was also a teacher in the Bulgarian school system in his native area, and a member of the Bulgarian Workers' Social Democratic Party. Today he is considered a hero in Bulgaria and in North Macedonia.

Biography

Early years
Karev completed his early education at the Bulgarian school in Kruševo and in 1893 moved to Sofia, the capital of Principality of Bulgaria, where he worked as a carpenter for the socialist Vasil Glavinov. Karev joined the Socialist group led by Glavinov, and through him, made acquaintance of Dimitar Blagoev and other socialists, and became a member of the Bulgarian Workers' Social Democratic Party. In 1896 he participated in the Macedonian-Adrianople Social Democratic Group, created as part of the Bulgarian Workers' Social-Democrat Party.  In 1898 Karev went back to Ottoman Macedonia and graduated from the Bulgarian Exarchate's gymnasium in Bitola. From 1900 he worked as a schoolmaster in the Bulgarian schools in the village of Gorno Divjaci and in his native Kruševo.

Political and revolutionary activity
The first Conference of Macedonian Socialists was held on June 3, 1900, near Kruševo, where they defined the core aspects of the potential creation of a separate Macedonian Republic, as a cantonized state, part of a future Balkan Socialist Federation, as a multinational polity offering equal rights to all its citizens. They maintained the slogan "Macedonia for the Macedonians", using Macedonian people as an umbrella term covering Bulgarians, Turks, Greeks, Aromanians, Albanians, Jews, etc., living in harmony in an independent state. In this period Karev joined the Internal Macedonian-Adrianople Revolutionary Organization and became a leader of a regional armed band (cheta). 

On the eve of the Ilinden uprising, in May 1903, he was interviewed in Bitola by the correspondent of the Greek daily Akropolis Stamatis Stamatiou. In the interview, Karev expresses his position of a radical leftist. Stamatiou described him as a Bulgarized Macedonian. Per Stamatiou, Karev presented himself as a voulgarofron, (i.e. Bulgarophile), and replied he was a Macedonian. In response to an ironic question by Stamatiou, Karev also claimed to be a "direct descendant of Alexander the Great", but added that "history says he was a Greek".  When asked what the revolutionaries wanted for Macedonia, Karev explained their plans to create a republic in the model of Switzerland, providing autonomy and democracy for its different "races". He added that Bulgaria's expectations to annex the region were miscalculated and that the revolutionaries would accept anyone's help in order to attain their goal.

During the Ilinden uprising of August 1903, when Kruševo was captured by the rebels, Karev allegedly authored the so-called Kruševo Manifesto, which called upon the local Muslim population to join forces with the Christians, and became the head of its provisional government. Amongst the various ethno-religious groups (millets) in Kruševo a Republican Council was elected with 60 members – 20 representatives from each one: Macedonian Bulgarians (Exarchists), Vlachs and Slav-speaking, Aromanian-speaking and Albanian-speaking Greek Patriarchists. The Council also elected an executive body – the Provisional Government, with six members (2 from each mentioned group). Though, an ethnic identification problem arose, because Karev called all the members of the local Council "brother Bulgarians", while the IMRO insurgents flew Bulgarian flags, killed several Greek Patriarchists, accused of being Ottoman spies, and subsequently assaulted the local Turk and Albanian Muslims. 

Lasting only ten days, the Kruševo Republic was destroyed by Ottoman forces after intense fighting.

After Ilinden
After the uprising Karev went back to Bulgaria and became a political activist of the newly founded Marxist Bulgarian Social Democratic Workers' Party (Narrow Socialists). However, the Narrows denounced the Ilinden uprising as an adventure inspired by the Bulgarian government, that played into the hands of the Great Powers. In 1904, Karev made a legal attempt to return to Macedonia, taking advantage of the Bulgarian-Ottoman Amnesty Agreement for the participants in the Ilinden Uprising. He sent several applications for amnesty to Istanbul through the cabinet of the Bulgarian Prime Minister Racho Petrov. The applications were received by the Ottoman Amnesty Commission but remained unanswered, despite the intercession of the Bulgarian diplomatic agent in Istanbul, Grigor Nachovich. 

On March 16, 1905, the chetas of Nikola Karev and Petar Acev passed through the Kyustendil checkpoint of the IMARO and entered Ottoman territory. There were five more people in Karev's squad. Soon after, Karev's detachment was discovered by a Turkish soldiers, and in the ensuing battle the voivode was killed near the village of Rajčani, together with his comrades Dimitar Gyurchev and Krastyo Naumov.

Family
His two brothers, Petar and Georgi also participated in IMRO. During the First and the Second World Wars, when Vardar Macedonia was annexed by Bulgaria, they supported the Bulgarian authorities. After World War I, both were abused when the area was returned to Serbian administration. During the Second World War, Georgi was a Mayor of Krusevo. After 1944 they were imprisoned as Bulgarian fascists' collaborators in Communist Yugoslavia, where both died in the internment camp of Idrizovo in 1950 and 1951 respectively. Nikola's nephew Mihail, the son of Georgi, was also imprisoned on a charge of "opposing the idea of Communist Yugoslavia".

Controversy over pro-Bulgarian sentiments
After the Second World War the short-lived Kruševo Republic was absorbed into the historical narrative of the new Socialist Republic of Macedonia, as the new Communist authorities eradicated "pro-Bulgarian" sentiments. Despite Karev's Bulgarian national identification, he was an ethnic Macedonian, according to Macedonian historiography. After 1944 the name of Nikola Karev was present in the anthem of the Socialist Republic of Macedonia: "Today over Macedonia". It was deleted in 1953 without explanation by the communist leadership led by Lazar Koliševski, as Nikola and his brothers Petar and Georgi were considered to be "Bulgarophiles".

Legacy 
Karev's remains were buried in Rajčani, a village nearby the locality he was killed. In 1953, on the 50th anniversary of the Ilinden Uprising, they were transferred to his hometown Kruševo. In 1990, they were transferred to the nearby monument, called Makedonium. 

In 2008, a large bronze equestrian monument of Nikola Karev was placed in front of Parliament Building in Skopje, cast by the Ferdinando Marinelli Artistic Foundry of Florence, Italy.

Notes

References

Bibliographies
 Пандев, К. "Устави и правилници на ВМОРО преди Илинденско-Преображенското въстание", Исторически преглед, 1969, кн. I, стр. 68–80. 
 Пандев, К. "Устави и правилници на ВМОРО преди Илинденско-Преображенското въстание", Извeстия на Института за история, т. 21, 1970, стр. 250–257. 
 Битоски, Крсте, сп. "Македонско Време", Скопје – март 1997, quoting: Quoting: Public Record Office – Foreign Office 78/4951 Turkey (Bulgaria), From Elliot, 1898, Устав на ТМОРО. S. 1. published in Документи за борбата на македонскиот народ за самостојност и за национална држава, Скопје, Универзитет "Кирил и Методиј": Факултет за филозофско-историски науки, 1981, pp 331 – 333. 
 Hugh Pouton Who Are the Macedonians?, C. Hurst & Co, 2000. p. 53. 
 Fikret Adanir, Die Makedonische Frage: ihre entestehung und etwicklung bis 1908., Wiessbaden 1979, p. 112.
 Duncan Perry The Politics of Terror: The Macedonian Liberation Movements, 1893–1903 , Durham, Duke University Press, 1988. pp. 40–41, 210 n. 10.
 Keith Brown,The Past in Question: Modern Macedonia and the Uncertainties of Nation, Princeton University Press, 2003.

1877 births
1905 deaths
People from Kruševo
Members of the Internal Macedonian Revolutionary Organization
Bulgarian Workers' Social Democratic Party politicians
Kruševo Republic
Ottoman Kruševo
Bulgarian revolutionaries
Bulgarian educators
Macedonian Bulgarians
Revolutionaries from the Ottoman Empire